Bulbophyllum capuronii is a species of orchid in the genus Bulbophyllum.

The Latin specific epithet of capuronii is in honor of the French botanist René Capuron.

It is native to Madagascar.

It was first published in Adansonia, n.s., Vol.11 on page 333 in 1971.

References

Other sources
The Bulbophyllum-Checklist
The Internet Orchid Species Photo Encyclopedia

capuronii
Plants described in 1971
Endemic flora of Madagascar